Two Vines is the third studio album by Australian electronic music duo Empire of the Sun. It was released on 28 October 2016 by Virgin EMI Records. The album features guest appearances from Fleetwood Mac's Lindsey Buckingham, Wendy Melvoin, Henry Hey, and Tim Lefebvre.

Background
The duo started writing their third studio album after contributing music to the 2014 film Dumb and Dumber To. The album was recorded in Hawaii and Los Angeles, and it was co-produced by Empire of the Sun and Peter Mayes alongside regular collaborator Jonathan Sloan. In November 2015, lead singer Luke Steele noted that the album was "75 percent there".

On 22 August 2016, it was announced that the album was titled Two Vines and would be released on 28 October. It features contributions from Fleetwood Mac singer-guitarist Lindsey Buckingham, Wendy Melvoin (from Prince's The Revolution band), and David Bowie collaborators Henry Hey and Tim Lefebvre. Nick Littlemore explained the inspiration behind the title as "this image of a modern city overtaken by jungle".

The album's lead single, "High and Low", was released on 24 August 2016. This was shortly followed by the album's first promotional single, "Two Vines", which was released the following day. "To Her Door" was released on 30 September 2016 as the album's second single.

Critical reception

Two Vines received generally positive reviews from critics. At Metacritic, which assigns a normalised rating out of 100 to reviews from mainstream publications, the album received an average score of 66, based on 14 reviews.

Track listing

Personnel
Credits adapted from the liner notes of Two Vines.

 Empire of the Sun – production
 Steve Bach – keyboards 
 Lindsey Buckingham – backing vocals, guitars 
 Evan Frasier – mbira 
 Teddy Geiger – vocals 
 Mark Goldenberg – acoustic guitar 
 Michael Harris – engineering , drum and percussion engineering 
 Henry Hey – keyboards 
 Scott Horscroft – A&R, production assistance
 SK Kakraba – gyil 
 Mito Kasuya – vocals 
 Tim Lefebvre – bass 

 Alan Mark Lightner – marimba, xylophone 
 Mike Marsh – mastering
 Peter Mayes – engineering, mixing, production
 Jake Najor – drums 
 Heather O'Brien – A&R coordination
 Todd Simon – percussion direction 
 Todd M. Simon – marimba, vibraphone 
 Donnie Sloan – production
 Dexter Story – slit drums 
 Te'Amir Yohannes Sweeney – slit drums 
 David Wilder – bass

Charts

Weekly charts

Year-end charts

References

2016 albums
Astralwerks albums
Empire of the Sun (band) albums
Virgin EMI Records albums
Albums recorded at Electro-Vox Recording Studios